Bexley Station is a pastoral lease that operates as a sheep station in Queensland.

Established at some time prior to 1890 by Edward Goddard Blume, the paddocks were burnt out the same year with the loss of most feed and some fencing. The property was stocked with sheep, producing 68 bales of wool in 1892 and 71 in 1893.

Blume sold Bexley in 1939 to T. Scanlan. Blume sold the  completely unstocked but retained the  Yanburra portion of the property for himself.

The area was flooded in 1950 and then a plague of snakes with 27 snakes being found in the homestead. In 1953 the property was owned by W. G. Allen and his wife and two sons.

In 2011 the property was still owned by Ross and Michelle McPherson.

See also
List of ranches and stations

References

Stations (Australian agriculture)
Pastoral leases in Queensland